Trypanophora semihyalina is a species of moth in the Zygaenidae family. It is found in south-east Asia, including India, China, Hong Kong and parts of Taiwan.

The larvae have been recorded feeding on Barringtonia acutangula, Bombax ceiba, Careya, Carissa carandas, Gardenia, Holarrhena, Lagerstroemia (including Lagerstroemia indica and Lagerstroemia speciosa), Ricinus communis, Rosa, Shorea robusta, Terminalia (including Terminalia catappa and Terminalia tomentosa) and Ziziphus (including Ziziphus mauritiana).

References 

Moths described in 1844
Chalcosiinae